The Cry is a 2018 television mystery psychological drama series written by Jacquelin Perske and adapted from the 2013 novel of the same name by Helen FitzGerald, which was broadcast on the ABC in Australia and BBC One in the UK. The series stars Jenna Coleman as Joanna Lyndsay, a schoolteacher whose four-month-old baby Noah disappears while she and her fiancé, Alistair (Ewen Leslie), are visiting family in Australia. The series was directed by Glendyn Ivin and produced by Synchronicity Films.

Synopsis
Joanna and Alistair are young parents who travel from Scotland to a town in Australia to visit family and fight for custody of Alistair's daughter, Chloe, against his Australian ex-wife, Alexandra. On the drive from Melbourne to the coastal town of Wilde Bay, their baby son Noah goes missing. In the aftermath of the tragedy, under public scrutiny, their relationship collapses and her psychological state disintegrates.

Awards

The show was nominated for an International Emmy in 2019.

Cast and characters
 Jenna Coleman as Joanna Lindsay; a primary school teacher living in Glasgow.
 Ewen Leslie as Alistair Robertson; an Australian working in Scotland as a media spin doctor and Joanna's fiancé
 Asher Keddie as Alexandra Grenville; Alistair's ex-wife and mother of Chloe
 Stella Gonet as Elizabeth Robertson; Alistair's mother
 Sophie Kennedy as Kirsty; Joanna's best friend
 Markella Kavenagh as Chloe Robertson; Alistair and Alexandra's daughter
 Alex Dimitriades as Detective Peter Alexiades; Melbourne police detective and a school friend of Alistair's
 Shareena Clanton as Detective Lorna Jones; partner of Detective Peter Alexiades
 Shauna Macdonald as Dr. Wallace; Joanna's psychiatrist
 Kate Dickie as Morven Davis
 David Elliot as Henry McCallum

Episodes

Production
The Cry is an adaptation of the novel of the same name by Helen FitzGerald. The series is produced by Synchronicity Films, directed by Glendyn Ivin and written for television by Jacquelin Perske.

Filming for the series commenced in February 2018, initially taking place in Australia. Filming later moved to Scotland in April 2018. Jenna Coleman, who portrays Joanna in the lead role, completed filming for the series in Australia and Glasgow in May 2018, so that production on the third series of Victoria could commence.

Release
The Cry comprises four episodes and premiered in the UK on BBC One on 30 September 2018. The series premiered in Australia on ABC on 3 February 2019.

References

External links
 
 

2018 British television series debuts
2018 British television series endings

2010s Australian drama television series
2010s Australian television miniseries
2010s British drama television series
2010s British mystery television series
2010s British television miniseries
Australian Broadcasting Corporation original programming
Australian mystery television series
BBC television dramas
BBC television miniseries
English-language television shows
Television series about families
Television series about marriage
Television series about missing people
Works about abuse
Psychological drama television and other works